Orius tristicolor, known generally as the minute flower bug or minute pirate bug, is a species of minute pirate bug in the family Anthocoridae. It is found in the Caribbean Sea, Central America, North America, Oceania, and South America.

References

Further reading

 

Anthocoridae
Articles created by Qbugbot
Insects described in 1879